The men's 12.5 km pursuit competition at the Biathlon World Championships 2023 was held on 12 February 2023.

Results
The race was started at 15:30.

References

Men's pursuit